Major Arthur Holroyd O'Hara Wood (10 January 1890  –  6 October 1918) was an Australian male tennis player and Royal Air Force pilot who was killed during the First World War.

O'Hara Wood was educated at Melbourne Grammar School and attended Trinity College, Melbourne University in 1908.

O'Hara Wood won the men's singles tennis championship of NSW in 1913 and of Victoria in 1914. In 1914 he reached the final of the Australasian Championships, played in Melbourne, where he faced his compatriot Gerald Patterson. O'Hara Wood used a variety of pace and spins to beat Patterson in four sets. Arthur's brother Pat O'Hara Wood was also a tennis player and won the Australasian Championships in 1920 and 1923.

In 1915, after the outbreak of the First World War, O'Hara Wood joined the Royal Flying Corps. He saw service in France and did instructional work in England in 1916. He was temporarily transferred to the Australian Flying Corps in France, then on 17 July 1918, when he celebrated his third anniversary at the war, he was appointed to an important post at flying school in England.

In 1918, Major O'Hara Wood was in command of 46 Squadron when during a patrol over Saint-Quentin on 4 October 1918, another aircraft flew into his. He died on 6 October 1918, at the 37th Casualty Clearing Station from multiple injuries. He is buried at the Bronfay Farm Military Cemetery in Bray-sur-Somme.

Grand Slam finals

Singles (1 title)

Doubles (1 runner-up)

References

External links 
 

1890 births
1918 deaths
Australasian Championships (tennis) champions
Australian male tennis players
Tennis players from Melbourne
People educated at Melbourne Grammar School
People educated at Trinity College (University of Melbourne)
Grand Slam (tennis) champions in men's singles
Australian military personnel killed in World War I
Military personnel from Melbourne
Royal Flying Corps officers